The Sovereign Congress, was the legislative assembly created on 11 January 1790 by the Treaty of Union which established the United Belgian States. Its primary task was to manage the sovereignty of the independent territories of the United States of Belgium during the Brabant Revolution.

Presidents of the Sovereign Congress
 François de Nélis, Bishop of Antwerp (11 January 1790 – 8 November 1790)
 Hendrik van Crumpipen (8 November 1790 – 2 December 1790)

See also
 National Congress of Belgium

External links
 Rulers of Belgium
 Text of the Treaty of Union 
 Text of the Treaty of Union 

United Belgian States
Historical legislatures in Belgium